Vaca Diéz is a province in the Beni Department, Bolivia. The two largest settlements in Vaca Diéz are Guayaramerín with a population of 35,764 in 2012, along with Riberalta with a population of 78,754. Vaca Diéz measures 16,228 km² (10,083 miles) in size.

See also
Exaltación, Vaca Diéz

References

Provinces of Beni Department